"Have You Seen Your Mother, Baby, Standing in the Shadow?" is a song by the English rock band the Rolling Stones. Written by Mick Jagger and Keith Richards, it was recorded in the late summer of 1966 during early sessions for what would become their Between the Buttons album. It was the first Stones single to be released simultaneously (23 September 1966) in both the UK and the US, and reached number five and number nine on those countries' charts, respectively.

Recording and releases

It is the first Rolling Stones song to feature a 1920s-influenced horn section, which was arranged by Mike Leander. The group have said that they were unhappy with the final cut, bemoaning the loss of the original cut's strong rhythm section. It is also the first song Richards is said to have written on piano even though he does not play piano on the final cut. Jack Nitzsche, friend of the band and their occasional pianist, is credited in the session logs to piano, multi-instrumentalist Brian Jones is also credited in the logs for playing the piano. However, when the band mimed the song on The Ed Sullivan Show on 11 September 1966, shortly before its release, Richards mimed the piano with Jones miming the guitar.

The American picture sleeve includes a photo of the band dressed in drag, shot by Jerry Schatzberg. Peter Whitehead's promotional film for the single was one of the first music videos. The Stones only performed the song live over a span of twelve days during their 1966 tour. One live recording appears on Got Live If You Want It! (1966, US). In 1993, Jagger performed it in New York City during his only show promoting his solo album Wandering Spirit.

The song is included on several Rolling Stones compilation albums, such as the British edition of Big Hits (High Tide and Green Grass) (1966), Flowers (1967, US), Through the Past, Darkly (Big Hits Vol. 2) (1969 US edition), and Forty Licks (2002, with the abbreviated title "Have You Seen Your Mother Baby?").

Reception
Cash Box said that it "the hard rocking, infectious sound is laced with a husky Jagger solo that builds back to a frenzied shout."

Personnel
According to authors Philippe Margotin and Jean-Michel Guesdon, except where noted:

The Rolling Stones
Mick Jagger lead vocals, backing vocals, finger snaps
Keith Richards backing vocals, lead guitar, acoustic guitar, piano
Brian Jones rhythm guitar
Bill Wyman bass
Charlie Watts drums

Additional musicians and production
Jack Nitzsche piano
Andrew Loog Oldham producer, backing vocals
Mike Leander orchestration (trumpets)
Mike Leander Orchestra trumpets
David Hassinger sound engineer
Glyn Johns sound engineer

Charts

Notes

References

Sources

 
 

The Rolling Stones songs
1966 singles
Decca Records singles
London Records singles
Songs written by Jagger–Richards
Song recordings produced by Andrew Loog Oldham
1966 songs
Songs about cross-dressing